Richard Alan Smallwood  (born 28 January 1937) is an Australian doctor and Chief Medical Officer of Australia between 1999 and 2003.

Smallwood graduated from University of Melbourne with a Bachelor of Medicine, Bachelor of Surgery in 1960 and Doctor of Medicine in 1964. He then trained at Royal Free Hospital in London and at Boston University School of Medicine. He returned to Australia in 1970 and took a role at the Austin Hospital, Melbourne in Melbourne.

Smallwood taught at the University of Melbourne for thirty years and is a Professor Emeritus at the University. He has published over 250 papers, mainly focused on the liver and liver disease. He was president of Royal Australasian College of Physicians from 2006 to 2008. In his time as Chief Medical Officer, Smallwood was responsible for addressing public concern about bioterrorism and the SARS epidemic.

Smallwood was made an Officer of the Order of Australia in the 1997 Queen's Birthday Honours for "service to medicine, particularly in the field of gastroenterology, to research through the National Health and Medical Research Council, and to education". He was awarded the Centenary Medal in 2001 for "service to public health especially as the Chief Medical Officer".

References

Living people
1937 births
20th-century Australian medical doctors
21st-century Australian medical doctors
20th-century Australian public servants
21st-century Australian public servants
Officers of the Order of Australia
Recipients of the Centenary Medal
Academic staff of the University of Melbourne
University of Melbourne alumni doctors